"The Wind Shifts" is a poem from Wallace Stevens's first book of poetry,  Harmonium. It was first published in 1917, so it is in the  public
domain.

Interpretation
"The wind shifts" explains why John Gould Fletcher detected a poet out of tune with life and with his surroundings. (See the main Harmonium essay.)

Buttel cites this poem as an example of Stevens's  mastery of repetition within free verse. The repetition of "the wind shifts" underscores the associated human feelings, and  "heavy and heavy" adds to  the effect of leaden monotony.

Notes

References 
Buttel, Robert. Wallace Stevens: The Making of Harmonium. 1967: Princeton University Press.

1917 poems
American poems
Poetry by Wallace Stevens
Poems about the wind